The 2011 European Women Basketball Championship, commonly called EuroBasket Women 2011, was the 33rd regional championship held by FIBA Europe. The competition was held in Poland from 2011. This was the 4th time that the EuroBasket Women was hosted by Poland.

Russia won its third title after defeating Turkey in the final. It was Russia's 6th final after the dissolution of the Soviet Union, while Turkey played final for the 1st time. The result score was 59–42 in favor of Russia, and it was Russia's 3rd title in the competition and first since 2007.

Venues

Competition System

Preliminary Round (June 18 – June 20) 
The 16 participants were divided into four groups of four teams each. The top three teams in each group advanced to the Qualifying Round. The last team was eliminated.

Qualifying Round (June 22 – June 27) 
There were two groups of six teams, each composed of the qualifiers from two Preliminary Round groups. The results in the Preliminary Round were taken into account. Each team played the teams that qualified from the other group. The top four teams advanced to the Quarterfinals. The bottom two teams were eliminated.

Final Round (June 29 – July 3) 
This stage was played in a knock-out system. In the quarterfinals, the first team in one group played the fourth team in the other group, while the second place team played against the third team in the opposite group. The winners of the quarterfinals advanced to the semifinals, and the winners of the semis progressed to the Final. The losers in the quarterfinals played for fifth to eighth places.

Qualified teams

Squads

Group Draw
The draw was held on 11 December 2010 at Łódź.

Preliminary round

Group A

Group B

Group C

Group D

Main round

Group E

Group F

Knockout stage

Championship bracket

5th place bracket 
{{Round4-with third|RD2=Fifth place|Consol=Seventh place

|June 30 || 84 || 75
|July 1 ||59||68

|July 2 ||73||59
|July 2 ||56||75|}}

 Quarterfinals 

 Classification round 

 Semifinals 

Seventh place game

 Fifth place game 

Bronze medal game

Final

All EuroBasket Women 2011 team:
Maria Stepanova
Nevriye Yılmaz
Eva Viteckova
Sandra Mandir
Elena Danilochkina

Statistical leadersPointsReboundsAssistsBlocksSteals'''

Final standings

References

External links

 
2011
EuroBasket Women
EuroBasket Women
International women's basketball competitions hosted by Poland
June 2011 sports events in Europe
July 2011 sports events in Europe
2010–11 in Polish basketball
Sport in Bydgoszcz
Sports competitions in Łódź
Sports competitions in Katowice
21st century in Katowice
21st century in Łódź